Alex Karbouris, known professionally as Alex K, is an Australian music producer, singer, songwriter and DJ. He is known for being one of the pioneers of the music genre 'NRG', and his Ultimate NRG and Kickin Hard compilations. He has sold over 600,000 albums worldwide, and has remixed and written for over 200 artists across the globe. Karbouris is one of Australia's highest selling hard dance exports.

Biography

1996–2004: Early life and career 
Originally beginning his career in 1994 at community radio station 99.3FM, he joined Australian radio station, Wild FM, and was responsible for numerous megamixes that featured on the Wild CD compilations. He signed with Central Station Records in 1998, and released the first of many compilations titled Kickin Hard, under the alias 'Alex K'.

2004–2011: Ultimate NRG
Karbouris moved from his hometown Sydney, Australia to Liverpool, UK in 2004, and signed a record deal with Universal/AATW. Despite the 'NRG' scene being viewed in the wider industry as a regional phenomena, largely assumed to be confined to the North West, Ultimate NRG 1, 2, 3, 4, 5 and Ultimate NRG Megamix all achieved gold status in the UK, with over 600,000 sales. Karbouris has had several chart hits with his productions, including "If you were mine", "Rise Again", and "Moving too fast". He has written and worked with many writers and producers, and had writing credits alongside Annie Lennox with his track "Angel in my heart".

His song "My Time", was featured and looped in the freeway chase scene of the movie Hancock in 2008.

He has remixed numerous mainstream and underground artists, including The Black Eyed Peas, Rihanna, Snoop Dogg, Lady Gaga, Nicole Scherzinger, Slinkee Minx and David Guetta.

Personal life 
His grandfather was Lee Gallagher, who formed the GTV-9 Showband and featured on the Graham Kennedy Show. His auntie is Greek actress Marilena Karbouri, most known from the series Xehase Me. Karbouris currently resides in Sydney, Australia, but tours Europe frequently.

Discography

References

External links 
 

1979 births
Living people
Club DJs
Australian electronic musicians